John Hearn (4 January 1827 – 17 May 1894) was an Irish-born businessman and political figure in Quebec. He represented Quebec West in the Legislative Assembly of Quebec from 1867 to 1877, Stadacona division in the Legislative Council of Quebec from 1877 to 1892 and Quebec West in the House of Commons of Canada from 1892 to 1894 as a Conservative member.

He was born in Waterford, the son of Thomas Hearn and Catherine Power, and was educated at Meagher’s Academy in Ireland. Hearn came to Quebec City in 1842. He first worked as a clerk for Quebec merchant Hugh Murray before entering business on his own as a ship chandler and grocer, later becoming a real estate agent. In 1849, Hearn married Mary Doran. He was a member of the Quebec municipal council from 1856 to 1865, from 1867 to 1873 and from 1877 to 1894, serving as chairman of the ferry committee and later the finance committee. During his time in office, Hearn mainly represented the interests of his Irish constituents. Hearn resigned his seat in the provincial assembly in 1877 after he was named to the Legislative Council. He was defeated by Thomas McGreevy in the 1891 federal election but elected to the House of Commons in an 1892 by-election held after McGreevy was expelled for corruption. Hearn died in office at Quebec City of tuberculosis at the age of 67.

Hearn was also a director for the St. Lawrence and Témiscouata Railway Company and the Great Northern Railway Company.

His son John Gabriel Hearn also served as a member of the Quebec assembly.

Electoral record

References

External links 

 

1827 births
1894 deaths
People from Waterford (city)
Politicians from County Waterford
Members of the House of Commons of Canada from Quebec
Conservative Party of Canada (1867–1942) MPs
Conservative Party of Quebec MNAs
Conservative Party of Quebec MLCs
Anglophone Quebec people
Irish emigrants to pre-Confederation Quebec